Kamran Shahid (Punjabi), is a Pakistani TV anchor person, academician, author and journalist. He is the main news anchor for the TV show On The Front with Kamran Shahid on Dunya News.

Personal life
Kamran Shahid belongs to a Punjabi Rajput family. He was born in Lahore, Punjab, Pakistan.

His father is the well known Pakistani film actor Shahid Hameed, while his mother, Munaza Shahid, studied at Kinnaird College for Women, Lahore, Pakistan and has been an academic.

Education
Kamran Shahid received his master's degree in Modern History from Government College University, Lahore. He holds a degree in International Relations from the University of Westminster, London. He has presented his research papers at different international forums.

Career
For 10 years, he taught at Punjab University, Lahore and Quaid-i-Azam University, Islamabad.
He started his career in television journalism from PTV. As a current affairs television anchor, Kamran has not confined himself to any one format. He has done a variety of programs from hard hitting socio-political and current affairs talk shows to documentaries and docu-dramas. He has to his credit many investigative programs as well. He has also conducted very informative and hard-hitting one-on-one interviews with many leading personalities including international dignitaries.

Kamran Shahid now leads the flagship show at Pakistani TV channel Dunya News —On the Front which is tri-weekly news program based on current-affairs and issues related to politics and socio-economic demographics. Before this TV show, he used to be an anchor person on Pakistani TV channel Express News TV show Frontline with Kamran Shahid. He was a guest speaker for the Oxford University - (Pakistan Society) at Oxfordshire County Hall during Pakistan Young Leaders Conference in February 2011.

Works

Books
Gandhi and the partition of India : a new perspective, Lahore : Ferozsons, 2005, 124 pages
International relations & political theory, Lahore : Ferozsons, 2006, 235 p.

Movie as a director
 The Trial (2017 film)

References

Living people
1976 births
Pakistani male journalists
Punjabi people
Journalists from Lahore
People from Islamabad
Defence and security analysts in Pakistan
Government College University, Lahore alumni
Alumni of the University of Westminster
People from Lahore